Ugandan English, or Uglish, is the variety of English spoken in Uganda. The term Uglish is first recorded in 2012. Other colloquial portmanteau words are Uganglish (recorded from 2006) and Ugandlish (2010).

Influence of indigenous languages
The speech patterns of Ugandan languages strongly influence spoken English. Uganda has a large variety of indigenous languages, and someone familiar with Uganda can readily identify the native language of a person speaking English.

The Bantu languages spoken in southern Uganda tend not to have consonants sounded alone without a vowel in the syllable. Indeed, the Luganda word for consonant is "silent letter". Similarly, muscular is pronounced .

Luganda never has an  starting a word; it only appears following the letters  and  within a word. The  sound, conversely, cannot follow these sounds. Thus the word railway gets its  and its  substituted, giving .

Luganda does not permit the sequence ; any occurrence of this sound becomes . Thus cute is pronounced .

The initial  is dysphonic to the Luganda speaker but is perfectly natural to the speaker of Runyankole and Rukiga, which have few instances of the  sound. The combination of the above three rules will transform calcium into .

Vocabulary and idioms
Some Ugandan English words have a peculiar meaning widely understood within Uganda but mystifying to foreigners. The origin of these usages may be obscure. The best known example is probably to extend, which in Uganda means move over on a seat to make room for someone else. Another example, "pop", is used to replace words like bring and come for example: Danny, pop that bottle here or Heno, pop to my house.

Terms for buildings
Sometimes the usage has a traceable origin. A basement is called a godown, but the usual meaning of warehouse is also known in Uganda as proper English.

A building labelled hotel, in a small town, is likely to be a restaurant.

Terms for clothing
The verb to put on is often substituted for to dress, to be dressed, or to wear. One may hear remarks such as "That lady is rich, don't you see how she is putting on" and "The police are looking for a man putting on a red shirt."

Terms for communication
Mobile phone services are prepaid. A person finding themselves with inadequate prepaid time to make a call will ring up the intended recipient of the call and hang up immediately. The receiver of the call, hearing the phone ring once and seeing the number, understands themselves to have been beeped. Alternatively, it is called being flashed on account of the brief flashing of the screen. The understood message is I wish to talk to you at your expense.

Terms for education and training
In the worlds of business and development, the word "facilitation" or the expression "to facilitate someone" have fundamentally different meanings in Uganda from those in Europe or the US. In Uganda, it most often means paying them for something. It is often a payment in part to cover some expenses, but is expected to go beyond just the "out-of-pocket" costs the recipient has incurred. Sometimes it can amount to the equivalent of a week or two's wages just for attending a meeting for a day or two. In business in Europe or the US, it usually means to help organise progress amongst a group of people in some way and almost never involves paying them anything. This is rather about helping them by doing preparation and analysis; by chairing and minute-taking at meetings and by mobilising, coaching and advising.

Terms for family members
Children whose fathers are brothers are considered siblings in most Ugandan tribes. The English word cousin conflates them with the children of a maternal uncle or those of aunts, who in a patrilineal society belong to a different clan. Thus, the terms cousin brother or cousin sister are used to identify the "close" cousins.

A dependant is a child who is not the biological offspring of the family with whom the child lives. Sometimes, dependants are referred to as sons, daughters, nephews, or nieces. The high number of children orphaned by AIDS and poverty combined with the communal culture of Uganda leads to an extremely high number of dependents and a great deal of confusion for an outsider trying to determine biological family structure.

Terms for food and farming
Drinking a beverage is often described as taking a beverage.
A pop is a soda.
All tea is also called chai.

French fries in Uganda are called chips, as in British English.

Macrons means spaghetti, which is generally fried in oil.

Irish potatoes are potatoes, while "potatoes" means sweet potatoes.

Sukuma wiki means collard greens. Ovacado or vacado means avocado. Posho refers to a dense mixture of cooked cornmeal and water also known as ugali.

Farming is often referred to as digging and fields under cultivation, even large ones, may be referred to as gardens.

Terms for language
The word vernacular, rarely used in ordinary conversation in most of the English speaking world, is common in Uganda to mean local language. It comes from the fact that in most primary schools, pupils are punished for speaking "vernacular", languages other than English. Since there are many local languages, they are usually classified as "vernacular".

Colloquial language is also used. Among the youth, certain verbs are given different past participle tenses as slang for example, the word “flop” is used as “flap” instead of “flopped” in the past participle, pronounced as /flap/.  In a sentence, “I flap the test” means “I didn’t do well in the test”. Other words used like this are game as gam, fetch as fatch and chop as chap. They follow the past participle rule of verbs like feed as fed and read as read.

Terms for money
When money is spent extravagantly on outings, shopping, recreations and the like, Ugandans are said to be "eating money." It is also a common phrase in reference to embezzlement, corruption, or misappropriation of funds: "The Minister ate the money," or "He was fired from his job because he ate money." This phrase also applies to living a lavish or abundant lifestyle, hence "You are eating money", which commonly means one is successful and doing well.

In Uganda the verb "demand" is often used instead of "owe", with inversion of subject and object. For example, I demand John ten thousand shillings meaning John owes me ten thousand shillings.

When out with friends to drink or shopping and someone takes the bill, the term house is used. For example, We went out with Kenneth last night and he housed us, meaning We went out with Kenneth last night and he paid for the drinks.

Foreign currency is forex, and currency exchange bureaus are forex bureaux.

In American and British English, a dishonoured check is said to bounce; Ugandans have adopted this phrase to refer to the inability to the failure to meet with someone — with or without an appointment: "I came to your place and bounced."

Terms for quality
Somehow is interspersed frequently, and means slightly, occasionally, or can imply doubt. When asked if you liked the food, and you enjoyed it slightly, you could simply reply 'somehow'.

The word fake can be used to chastise a person about something. For example, if one's friend went on an exciting evening out without inviting the other friend, one might hear the latter complain, saying "Eeh, you man, you are fake!"

Terms for religion
A save-dee is someone who has found God, often referred to in other English-speaking countries as being saved.
Individuals who would be referred to elsewhere as atheists and agnostics are referred to as pagans.

Words for social events and greetings
Congs is frequently used as shortening of congratulations. Wel be back is a bastardised way of saying welcome back, but it used much more commonly.

The word lost is used to mean that one has not seen the person in a long time. One would say "Eeeh, but you are lost."

The phrase "ok please" is used to convey agreement or acknowledgement. It can also be used to signal a transition. For instance, if a person is preparing to leave, he might break a moment of silence with "ok please" and then announce that he is leaving. "Thank you please" has a similar meaning, but can also mean thank you. "Please" never means please. If Ugandans want something, they say "You give me..." Please is not required; the tone of the voice is normally enough to convey politeness.

Terms for transport and giving directions
Forms of transport are referred to as means. For instance: 'I could not reach the party last night; I had no means'.

A "taxi" is a van used like a bus, carrying many persons along a fixed route. A taxi taking one passenger at a time on a negotiable route is referred to as a special hire. A tow truck is a breakdown.

A motorbike or bicycle used for the same purpose is a bodaboda. The term originated at the Uganda–Kenya border crossing at Busia, where a kilometre separates the downtown area from the border post on the Ugandan side. Travellers dropped off at the bus/taxi station by buses or taxis, or those coming to Uganda from the Kenya side, were ferried over this distance by enterprising cyclists, who would attract business by calling "border, border".

The title Captain is applied to all pilots, not just those in command of a plane. Pilot is often used to refer to the driver of a bus, (minivan) taxi or "special hire".

When people walk they say they "foot".

When giving directions, the following expressions are common: to slope means going in a particular direction which is not necessarily downhill; to branch means to turn.

"To give someone a push" means to accompany a person home for some distance. When a car "sleeps" outside, it means it stays outside, not in the compound or in the garage.

Terms for witchcraft
A practitioner of witchcraft is referred to as a Witch doctor. The origin is unclear, and is not a direct translation from a Ugandan language. A practitioner of witchcraft in Uganda is referred to as a Witch-doctor, though this term is often also used to refer to practitioners of local medicines (e.g. herbal medicines). Nightdancer, however, refers to a person who has been possessed by a spirit, causing them to dance naked in the wee hours of the night, and very often causing them to defecate and smear human excrement on people's door posts. This usage can be found throughout Uganda, regardless of tribal origin. It eventually became synonymous with witch-doctors, as they were usually possessed by these spirits. Nightdancer, is also commonly used to refer to cannibals, not that this is a common practice. For example, a parent may say, You will become a nightdancer. to a child who is biting their fingernails. This implies that the child may eventually start eating human flesh instead of just fingernails.

Other terms
The word downer is used instead of lower, used in opposition to upper. For example: "I broke my upper leg, but my downer leg was paining, too."
The word paining is often used in place of the word hurting to mean the same thing.

"Sorry" tends to be used in different ways in Uganda and England. Ugandans are perfectly correct to use the word to express sympathy and sadness for something undesirable that has happened to someone by saying "Oh, sorry" or "I'm sorry". However, in England direct use like this is now usually an expression of regret with some responsibility attached - a form of apology. If they were not involved and just mean to express sympathy, they are likely to be less direct - "I'm sorry to hear that" or "that's really sad", or "that's terrible".

Ever is used to mean often, in the same way always is used in American English. It is the opposite of the exaggeration never. For example, if someone is often late, a Ugandan might say "She is ever late."

The Broadway play The Vagina Monologues had a brief, but notorious, appearance on the Ugandan stage before being banned by government censors. The brouhaha led to the entry of the word monologue into Ugandan English as a euphemism for vagina. The newspaper Red Pepper popularised the use of the word kandahar and after the 2010 World Cup, vuvuzela for vagina, and whopper for penis.

The adjective whole is used to emphasise disapproval of conduct unbecoming a person's rank or station. Examples: "How can a whole Minister go to that cheap nightclub?" or "How can a whole headmaster dress so badly?" The usage is a direct translation from several Ugandan languages.

Among younger people, proggie (shortened version of programme) is common when referring to one's social plans, e.g. Susan, what's your proggie for the weekend, let's hook up.

The word Zibbs is an often used word to mean problems. Example:  I failed the exam, now those are other zibbs This term originates from the Luganda word for problems ebizibu

The adverb Just is often used at the end of the statement to express obviousness. Example: During a phone call, one would tell a friend, I am at home eating food, just.

The noun Gas is in some scenarios used to denote physical strength as opposed to an air like fluid or gasoline. Example: I have no gas to read for the exam.

Among students Paper means exam. One can normally hear Ugandan students exclaiming, The paper was hard! to mean that the exam was difficult.

The noun Mob does not necessarily denote a large unruly crowd of people but can also be used to mean objects. In some contexts, to Ugandans, mob can mean "a lot" or "a significant amount". For example, There are mob people in that building means that there are a lot of people in the building. The people represented in the example do not have to be unruly to be referred to as a mob. Another example, We have mob food here means we have a lot of food.

In the dialect of English used in Karamoja, to enjoy can be used as "to be married to", as in the sentence, "I used to enjoy Narot but now, since the divorce, I am enjoying Nakoto."

Borrowed terms
Ugandan words are often inserted into English because the English equivalent does not convey the sense the Ugandan speaker intends.

The standard English term brother-in-law applies to both a spouse's brother and a spouse's sister's husband. A man's relationship with these two entails two quite different sets of obligations and norms in Ugandan society. Thus Luganda speakers will often use muko (wife's brother) and musangi (literally “one you met,” meaning you met at the girl's home while wooing her) to make the distinction.

Sometimes only a prefix is borrowed. In Luganda the prefix ka- before a noun denotes smallness. A Member of Parliament, referring to a  Finance Minister, said in a debate "the ka-man is innocent." Ka-child and ka-thing are also common. Thus, in most cases it is used to refer to the size of an object. For example, many cell phones in Uganda have flash lights, or "torches," as an accessory of the phones. Ugandans refer to this light as the "katorchi" since the light emitted from the phone comes from a small bulb at the top. But it can also be diminutive, such as in the case when a woman is telling her friends how she was bothered by an overly flirtatious young man on the taxi, "Eh! this ka-boy really disturbed me on the taxi. He would not stop asking for my number." Here the ka is used not so much to refer to whether or not the boy was short or tall, but rather as a way to reflect how he bothered her. Ka-timba, however, in the context of building construction refers to a thin piece of steel (such as re-bar), rather than the wood which one might expect. On the other hand, akatimba (obutimba, plural) is the name for a mosquito net. Thus, as is common in Uganda, one word will have multiple, if not numerous, meanings depending on the context in which it is used, as will the prefixes.

The Luganda conjunction nti is often slipped into English sentences instead of that. Thus, one will hear a quotation like "The Minister said nti corruption will not be tolerated." If the speaker is skeptical he will use mbu instead of nti: "The Minister said mbu corruption will not be tolerated" implies that it's just talk; business will go on as usual.

In some Ugandan languages, the same verb can be used to express thanks, congratulations, and appreciation of a job well done. It is normal for an African working in his own garden to be thanked for his work by a passing stranger. If one buys a new car in Uganda, or wins a race, one should not be surprised to find themselves being thanked.

People are also thanked early in the morning as a form of greeting. Therefore, a Luganda speaker may translate "gyebale" by saying "well done". They are just greeting others by way of thanking them for their usual work, not necessarily for a particular task.

The expression well done is extrapolated to specific actions. Examples include well fought, to soldiers on the winning side after a war; well bought, to someone with a new car or house; and even well put on, to a well-dressed person.

Ugandans often create portmanteaus from Luganda English words. For example, "I am going to change into a dress" becomes "I'm going to ku-changi-nga." In other cases, they add -ing at the end of a Luganda word; thus, a young girl can say "That gentleman was kwaana-ring me" to mean the gentleman was chatting me up. Or still letter "-d" or "-ed" can be added at the end of a Luganda word. For example, "Brenda kwanjula-d Brian at her parents' home" to mean "Brenda introduced Brian at her parents' home".

Grammar differences
Ugandans will frequently combine two sentences into one using the word and. For example, a barber will say "Sit down and I cut your hair," or a messenger might say "They told me to come and you give me the package." The usage makes sense in most Ugandan languages, but in these languages the word and is implied, not stated.

The personal pronoun is usually added to imperative sentences. Thus, one hears the phrase "Go to Entebbe;" or "Please go to Entebbe" will become "You go to Entebbe." "Please come here" becomes "You come." "Let's go" becomes "we go".

Prepositions
Like many speakers of foreign languages, Ugandans change, add and omit prepositions that are normally used by native speakers. For example, Ugandans:
 decrease on things, not decrease things
 demand for things, not demand things
 yield into things, not yield (produce) things or yield to (give way to) things

Pronunciation
Ugandan pronunciation of English varies widely depending on the level of education of teachers and the exposure to English. Since native speakers, English recordings, and dictionaries with pronunciation guides are not readily available to most Ugandans, they rely on spelling to guess how to pronounce words. As a result, visitors will hear "spelling pronunciation". For example, in Kampala, "acacia" as in Acacia Avenue is pronounced /a ˈka sia/, not /əˈkeɪʃə/ or /əˈkeɪ sɪə/.

Spelling
Standard English spelling rules are often flouted, even in official publications. For example, the word dining is frequently spelt "dinning," which to a native English speaker would be pronounced with a "short" i , as if it refers to making a loud noise (din) rather than referring to the room in which eating takes place (dine). Businesses that are labelled saloons are, in reality, western salons.

An example would be the use of "batter" for "butter" (spread on bread). Ugandan English also can be thought in a similar way to American and British English.

Notes

References

Further reading

External links
 Features of Ugandan English and a listing of the more common expressions of Ugandan English.

Ugandan culture
Dialects of English